Richard E. Angle is a United States Army major general who serves as the commanding general of the 1st Special Forces Command (Airborne) since August 12, 2021. He previously served as deputy commander of the Joint Special Operations Command.

Military career
Angle was commissioned as a second lieutenant in 1991 following graduation from United States Military Academy at West Point. His first assignment was with the 1st Battalion, 4th Infantry Regiment in Germany as an infantry officer. Angle volunteered for Army Special Forces and subsequently graduated from the Special Forces Qualification Course at Fort Bragg, North Carolina. Angle commanded a Special Forces Operational Detachment of the 2nd Battalion, 10th Special Forces Group, with which he deployed to Bosnia and Kosovo.

Following graduation from the Army Command and General Staff College, Angle was selected for the Intelligence Support Activity in 2000, a secret unit conducting signal and human intelligence gathering for the Joint Special Operations Command. He served as troop commander, squadron operations officer, unit operations officer, and later squadron commander. Angle took command of the 1st Battalion, 1st Special Forces Group in Okinawa, Japan from 2008 to 2010. He later returned to ISA as unit commander from 2012 to 2014. Angle completed numerous deployments to Afghanistan, Africa, Pakistan, and Iraq. Angle then received assignment as Chief of Staff, U.S. Army Special Operations Command in 2017.
 
As a general officer, Angle served as Deputy Commanding General, 1st Special Forces Command; Deputy Commanding General (Operations), United States Army Cyber Command; and then as Deputy Commander, Joint Special Operations Command. In March 2021, he was assigned to succeed John W. Brennan Jr. as Commanding General, 1st Special Forces Command (Airborne).

Awards and decorations

References

|-

Living people
Recipients of the Defense Superior Service Medal
Recipients of the Legion of Merit
United States Army generals
United States Army personnel of the Iraq War
United States Army personnel of the War in Afghanistan (2001–2021)
Year of birth missing (living people)